The Medal for Merit to Culture – Gloria Artis or Gloria Artis Medal, is a departmental decoration of Poland in arts awarded by the Ministry of Culture and National Heritage of the Republic of Poland to persons and organizations for distinguished contributions to, or protection of the Polish culture and national heritage.

There are three classes for the medal: gold, silver and bronze with a green, blue or claret ribbon, respectively, with central white and red stripes. This award was instituted on 17 June 2005. as a replacement of the honorary badge „Zasłużony Działacz Kultury”,  as part of the general reform in management of culture and education.

Gallery

See also
Decoration of Honor Meritorious for Polish Culture
Orders, decorations, and medals of Poland
:Category:Recipients of the Medal for Merit to Culture – Gloria Artis

References

External links
Poland: Medal for Merit to Culture "Gloria Artis"

Civil awards and decorations of Poland
Awards established in 2006
Departmental decorations of Poland
2006 establishments in Poland